Blues in the Closet  is a studio album by the jazz pianist Bud Powell. Released in 1958 by Verve, it contains a session that Powell recorded at Fine Sound Studios in New York in September 1956.

The album was released as a CD replica by Verve (Japan) in 2006 (POCJ-2744). The sessions (with alternate takes) are also available on The Complete Bud Powell on Verve (1994) CD box set.

History 
This session is the last that Powell recorded for Verve, and re-unites him with Ray Brown for the first time (in the studio at least) since the first Verve sessions back in 1949-50. Fittingly, it ends with "52nd Street Theme", the traditional closing number in the heyday of bebop in the nineteen-forties.

Track listing 12" LP (MGV 8218) 
 "When I Fall in Love" (Victor Young, Edward Heyman) – 1:42
 "My Heart Stood Still" (Richard Rodgers, Lorenz Hart) – 3:33
 "Blues in the Closet" (aka "Collard Greens and Black Eyed Peas") (Harry Babasin, Oscar Pettiford) – 3:04
 "Swingin' Till the Girls Come Home" (Pettiford) – 3:24
 "I Know That You Know" (Vincent Youmans, Anne Caldwell) – 2:26
 "Elegy" (aka "Elogie") – 3:00
 "Woody 'n You" (Dizzy Gillespie) – 3:55
 "I Should Care" (Sammy Cahn, Axel Stordahl, Paul Weston) – 3:42
 "Now's the Time" (Charlie Parker) – 4:36
 "I Didn't Know What Time It Was" (Rodgers, Hart) – 4:02
 "Be-Bop" (Gillespie) – 2:27
 "52nd Street Theme" (Thelonious Monk) – 2:24

Personnel

Performance 
September 23, 1956. Fine Sound Studios, New York.
 Bud Powell – piano
 Ray Brown – double bass
 Osie Johnson – drums

Production 
 Norman Granz – producer

References 

Bud Powell albums
1958 albums
Albums produced by Norman Granz
Verve Records albums